"Not Ready to Make Nice" is a song co-written and performed by American country music trio Dixie Chicks. It was released in March 2006 as the first single from the band's seventh studio album, Taking the Long Way. The Dixie Chicks wrote the song in response to the backlash they experienced in 2003 after criticizing President George W. Bush.

"Not Ready to Make Nice" remains the Dixie Chicks' biggest hit in Canada—it is their only song to be certified 2× Platinum and reach the top five on the Hot 100 (they have had bigger hits on the country charts). The song was written by Natalie Maines, Martie Maguire, Emily Robison, and Dan Wilson.

On February 11, 2007, it won three Grammy Awards in the categories of Record of the Year, Song of the Year, and Best Country Performance by a Duo or Group with Vocal. In 2009, Rolling Stone named "Not Ready to Make Nice" the 77th best song of the decade.

Background

Controversy erupted over the Dixie Chicks in 2003 following a critical comment vocalist Natalie Maines made about American President George W. Bush while performing in a concert in London, United Kingdom. In relation to the forthcoming invasion of Iraq, Maines said, "...we don't want this war, this violence, and we're ashamed that the President of the United States is from Texas."

Taking the Long Way was the first studio album released by the Dixie Chicks following the controversy, the band's reaction to which forms the major theme of some of the songs in the album. Most notable among these is "Not Ready to Make Nice", which was written by all three band members (Maines, Emily Robison and Martie Maguire) along with Dan Wilson, as an expression of band's reaction to the banning of their songs from country music radio stations, and their thoughts on freedom of speech.

The band went on to the October 25 episode of The Oprah Winfrey Show to promote the documentary film Shut Up and Sing and the music video of the song was quickly shown. While interviewing the band, Winfrey said the song is so well written that someone cannot even tell if it concerns the controversy. Indeed, Maines said that she and the other songwriters wanted the song to have a universal interpretation. However, the final lines of the fourth verse are unequivocally about the death threats the band received during the 2003 Top of the World Tour:

"And how in the world
Can the words that I said
Send somebody so over the edge
That they'd write me a letter
Saying that I better shut up and sing
Or my life will be over."

Some other lines in the beginning of this same verse are about a scene featured in the documentary Shut Up and Sing, in which a mother, who was protesting the Dixie Chicks at one of their concerts, is goading her young child to say "screw 'em!":
"It's a sad sad story
When a mother will teach her
Daughter that she ought'a hate a perfect stranger."
In the song, "daughter" was used instead of "son" as a matter of poetic license.

Comments by band members
The band members released their comments about writing the songs of Taking the Long Way through the website Frontpage Publicity. They commented the following about "Not Ready to Make Nice":

Emily: "The stakes were definitely higher on that song. We knew it was special because it was so autobiographical, and we had to get it right. We've all gone through so many emotions about the incident. We talked for days with Dan before putting pen to paper, and he really helped get inside our heads and put these feelings out. And once we had this song done, it freed us up to do the rest of the album without that burden."
Martie: "We had reached a point where we were laughing a lot about it, and people didn't really know how far it had gone. I realized I had suppressed a lot about the death threat. It all came flooding back in the process of writing this song, I think we all realized just how painful it had been for us.."
Natalie: "We tried to write about the incident a few times, but you get nervous that you're being too preachy or too victimized or too nonchalant. Dan came in with an idea that was some kind of concession, more 'can't we all just get along?' and I said, nope, I can't say that, can't do it. And we talked about it, and he said, what about "I'm not ready to make nice?" From the outside, normal people really weren't aware of how bizarre and absurd it got. Dan was really good at cluing in to that, saying something that didn't back down, but still had a vulnerability to it. This album was therapy. To write these songs allowed me to find peace with everything and move on."

Music video
The music video for "Not Ready to Make Nice" was filmed on March 9, 2006 and directed by Sophie Muller. The video starts with a scene of Natalie painting the white clothes of the other two band members, Martie and Emily, with black paint, which symbolizes the boycott of the band. Then, Natalie is seen wearing a black dress with her hands on a puddle of black paint. In another scene, the band members are sitting in a chair and when Natalie gets up to say something, Martie and Emily pull her back in to the chair. Then, Natalie and the other Dixie Chicks are seen in an environment that looks like a classroom and the teacher sends Natalie to write the English proverb "To talk without thinking is to shoot without aiming" on the blackboard. On the final scenes of the video, Natalie is seen in front of three doctors in what appears to be a mental institution, trying to escape from them. The video ends with a close shot of Natalie.

The music video of the song broke the record as the longest run at #1 on VH1's VSpot Top 20 Countdown spending 15 weeks at the top, 14 of them consecutive. The video also became the second ever to retire to the 20/20 club on the show on 7 October 2006, when it was at #9 on the countdown. In December 2006, it was named one of the best videos of the year by VH1. "Not Ready to Make Nice" was ranked #36 on CMT's 2008 ranking of the 100 Greatest Videos.

MADtv parody
The Fox late-night sketch show MADtv performed a parody of the "Not Ready to Make Nice" music video. In the parody, Crista Flanagan portrays Natalie Maines as standing by her comments about George W. Bush; however, her bandmates, portrayed by Nicole Parker and Arden Myrin, want to apologize so they can remain popular in the United States. Flanagan, as Maines, states that there is no God, she supports radical Islamic Jihad, and that every woman should wear a burqa. In the parody, Flanagan writes on a blackboard, "I am angry and important". In the parody, Flanagan is lobotimized and her bandmates toast the operation; whereas in the original, Maines resists being treated by doctors and is toasted by her bandmates.

Critical reception
"Not Ready to Make Nice" received universal acclaim from contemporary music critics of publications like Allmusic, Entertainment Weekly, Rolling Stone and USA Today. The song has been praised by these critics for being a statement in which the band does not regret Maines' anti-Bush statement. Allmusic reviewer Stephen Thomas Erlewine said the following about "Not Ready to Make Nice" that "Given the controversy of 2003, the conscious distancing from country makes sense — and given songs like the defiant 'Not Ready to Make Nice', the Dixie Chicks don't sound like they're in retreat on Taking the Long Way; they merely sound like they're being themselves." Entertainment Weekly music reviewer David Browne said that "If you wonder whether they have regrets about the incident, 'Not Ready to Make Nice' makes it clear they don't. When Maines gets to the part about all the death threats, her voice rises and the strings well up; it's a true pop-money-shot moment." Rolling Stone music reviewer Barry Walters commented the following about the song, "Rather than try to forget about singer Natalie Maines' anti-Bush remarks of 2003 -- which landed them in hot water with a lot of station program directors -- the threesome declares it's still 'Not Ready to Make Nice'." USA Today music reviewer Brian Mansfield commented the following about the song, "They're 'Not Ready to Make Nice' with the yahoos who threatened their lives over an offhanded comment. So give the Chicks credit for sticking to their guns, and give them more for getting on with life." The Village Voices Pazz & Jop annual critics' poll voted "Not Ready to Make Nice" as the eighth best single of 2006.

Live performances history
To promote both the single and the album, the Dixie Chicks performed the song live on some television programs such as on The Ellen DeGeneres Show, Good Morning America, Late Show with David Letterman, among others. It was also performed to internet radios such as Sessions@AOL and LAUNCHcast. It was performed in every single concert of the band's Accidents & Accusations Tour (June 15–December 5, 2006). It was also performed at the 49th Grammy Awards, just minutes before the band won the awards for Song of the Year and Record of the Year. (In a nod to the controversial origins of the song, Grammy producers had longtime singer-activist Joan Baez introduce the performance.)

Chart and sales performance
"Not Ready to Make Nice" initially peaked at number 23 on the Billboard Hot 100 chart, becoming the first song by the band to chart in the U.S. after the 2003 controversy and their last top ten hit. It was able to chart in the Billboard Hot 100 because of a high number of download sales (it debuted at number 11 and peaked at number eight on the Hot Digital Songs chart), despite low country radio airplay.

For the issue dated February 24, 2007, in the wake of its Grammy success, the song re-entered the Hot 100 at number four, after a 20-week absence, becoming the band's highest charting single to date on the general music charts. That same week, the song would also receive a Gold certification from the Recording Industry Association of America for digital downloads of over 500,000. However, its drop to number 28 in the next week broke the record for the biggest drop out of the top five in a single week, beating Clay Aiken's "Solitaire", which fell from number four to number 27 four years earlier. The song was certified Platinum in the United States on July 20, 2013, and as of March 2020, the song has sold 2,000,000 digital copies in the US.

The song was also very popular in Canada, where it peaked at number three on the BDS chart. It also became a top 20 hit in Australia, becoming the second single of the band to chart on the ARIA chart, at number 18. In the United Kingdom, the song charted poorly on the UK Singles Chart, peaking at number 70; however, it became the fourth single by the band to chart in that country.

Charts and certifications

Weekly charts

Year-end charts

Certifications

Awards
2007 CMT Music Awards:
Video of the Year (nominated)
Group Video of the Year (nominated)

49th Grammy Awards:
Record of the Year (won)
Song of the Year (won)
Best Country Performance by a Duo or Group with Vocal (won)

References

External links
The Dixie Chicks official website

2006 songs
2006 singles
The Chicks songs
Grammy Award for Record of the Year
Grammy Award for Song of the Year
Music videos directed by Sophie Muller
Song recordings produced by Rick Rubin
Songs written by Dan Wilson (musician)
Songs written by Martie Maguire
Songs written by Emily Robison
Songs written by Natalie Maines
Columbia Nashville Records singles
Country ballads